International Commission of Agricultural and Biosystems Engineering – CIGR (Commission Internationale du Genie Rural) founded in 1930 in Liège, Belgium, as an international, non-governmental, non-profit organization regrouping, as a networking system, regional and national societies of agricultural and biological engineering as well as private and public companies and individuals all over the world, is the largest and highest international institution in the field. Until 2008 the organisation was known as International Commission of Agricultural Engineering. Its membership includes American Society of Agricultural and Biological Engineers (ASABE), Asian Association for Agricultural Engineering (AAAE), European Society of Agricultural Engineers (EurAgEng), Latin American and Caribbean Association of Agricultural Engineering (ALIA), South and East African Society of Agricultural Engineering (SEASAE), Euro Asian Association of Agricultural Engineers (EAAAE), Association of Agricultural Engineers of South-Eastern Europe (AAESEE), and many national societies.

Aims
The main missions of CIGR are to
 stimulate the development of science and technology in the field of Agricultural Engineering,
 encourage education, training and mobility of young professionals,
 encourage inter regional mobility,
 facilitate the exchange of research results and technology,
 represent the profession at a worldwide level,
 work towards the establishment of new associations, both at national and regional level, and to the strengthening of existing ones, and to
 perform any other activity that will help to develop Agricultural Engineering and allied sciences.

Structure
The structure of CIGR is divided by seven technical Sections and various working groups. Each technical Section is charged with promoting and developing its respective field of science and technology as it relates to agricultural engineering. The CIGR Working Groups are appointed by the Executive Board to carry out studies on specific subjects of international importance and interest.

 CIGR Technical Sections:
Section I: Land and Water Engineering
Section II: Farm Buildings, Equipment, Structures and Environment
Section III: Equipment Engineering for Plant Production
Section IV: Rural Electricity and other Energy Sources
Section V: Management, Ergonomics and Systems Engineering
Section VI: Postharvest Technology and process Engineering
Section VII: Information Systems
 CIGR Working Groups:
Earth Observation for Land and Water Engineering Working Group
Animal Housing in Hot Climate Working Group
Rural Development and the Preservation of Cultural Heritages Working Group
Cattle Housing Working Group
Agricultural Engineering University Curricula Harmonization Working Group
Rural Landscape Protection and Valorisation Working Group
Image Analysis for Agricultural Processes and Products Working Group

Congresses

Conferences

Presidents
1930–1950 Prof. Georges Bouckaert
1950–1962 Prof. Armand Blanc
1963–1967 Prof. Eladio Aranda Heredia
1967–1969 Honorary Doctor Pierre Regamey
1969–1974 Prof. Karel Petit
1974–1979 Mr. Fiepko Coolman
1979–1980 Mr. Talcott W. Edminster 
1985–1989 Prof. László Lehoczky
1989–1991 Prof. Paul McNulty
1991–1994 Prof. Giuseppe Pellizzi
1995–1996 Prof. Egil Berge
1997–1998 Prof. Osamu Kitani
1999–2000 Prof. Bill Stout
2001–2002 Prof. El Houssine Bartali
2003–2004 Prof. Axel Munack
2005–2006 Prof. Luis Santos Pereira
2007–2008 Prof. Irenilza de Alencar Naas)
2009–2010 Prof. Søren Pedersen
2011–2012 Prof. Fedro Zazueta
2013–2014 Prof. Da-Wen Sun
2015-2016 Prof. Tadeusz Juliszewski

Fellows
The title of Fellow is the highest honour in CIGR. The title of Fellow is conferred to individuals who have made sustained, outstanding contributions world-wide, and that continue to improve the outcomes of the Agricultural and Bio-systems Engineering profession.
2000: P. Abeels (Belgium), J. De Baerdemaeker (Belgium), E. Berge (Norway), J. Daelemans (Belgium), G. Pellizzi (Italy), Z. Sibalszky (Hungary), G. Singh (Thailand), J. Souty (France), H.van Lier (The Netherlands), H. Heege (Germany)
2002: A. Kamaruddin, G. Papadakis, J. Ortiz-Canavate, O. Marchenko, Y. Kishida, F. Bakker-Arkema, C. Hall, F. Coolman, A. Musy
2006: El Hassan Bourarach, Bill Stout, El Houssine Bartali, Makoto Hoki, Maohua Wang, Osamu Kitani

See also
 Agricultural engineering
 Engineering
 Food engineering
 Food and Bioprocess Technology

External links
CIGR official website
CIGR 2010 Congress official website
CIGR 2012 Conference official website
Agricultural Engineering International (CIGR)
Biosystems Engineering (Elsevier)

Engineering societies
International learned societies
International professional associations
Societies
Organizations established in 1930
Professional associations based in Japan